The women's 4 × 100 metre medley relay competition of the swimming events at the 1975 Pan American Games took place on 19 October. The defending Pan American Games champion is the Canada.

Results
All times are in minutes and seconds.

Heats

Final 
The final was held on October 19.

References

Swimming at the 1975 Pan American Games
Pan